Camp Arcadia is a Lutheran camp, owned and operated by the Lutheran Camp Association. Located on the shores of Lake Michigan in the small town of Arcadia, Michigan, Camp Arcadia has been in continuous operation since its opening in 1922.

Geography
Camp Arcadia is located in Arcadia Township in Manistee County, Michigan. The main access road is M-22.

History
Camp Arcadia opened in 1922 under the direction of the Walther League, the young adult group of the Lutheran Church–Missouri Synod. From its opening until his death in 1963, William "Chief" Wieherman ran the camp along with his wife Hildegard, affectionately known as "Mom". When the Walther League ceased operations in 1968. the future of the camp was uncertain, until a group of dedicated campers formed the Lutheran Camp Association and bought all  of the camp. The LCA, a non-profit corporation, has operated the camp ever since. The camp was entered onto the National Register of Historic Places in 2017.

Today
Camp Arcadia continues to run under the direction of the LCA. The current president is Stan Scheumann. Each summer, 39 college-age adults live and work at the camp. These employees cook, clean, and run the programs for the campers. In addition to the summer staff, Camp Arcadia employs the following year-round management team: executive director (Chip May), food service director (Taryn Woell), office manager (Rachel Catanese), program director (Jess McCallum Knoll), caretaker (Franco Marano), and donor relations/communications coordinator (Sarah Olson). The archives manager is Ryan McKenna.

The camp opens on Memorial Day weekend. During this event, campers are invited to stay for free, provided they help in getting the property ready for the summer. After a week to train the summer staff, the camp begins its summer retreats, most of which are family weeks. After Labor Day weekend, the camp generally runs retreats through October, when it is then closed for winter.

Gallery

References

External links 
 

Organizations based in Michigan
Lutheranism in Michigan
Lutheran organizations
Arcadia
National Register of Historic Places in Manistee County, Michigan
Lutheran Church–Missouri Synod